International Socialists may refer to:

Organizations

Organizations affiliated with the International Socialist Tendency 
 International Socialist Organization, an American Trotskyist group from 1976 to 2019 which was expelled from the International Socialist Tendency in 2001
 International Socialists (Australia), an Australian Trotskyist group
 International Socialists (Brazil)
 International Socialists (Canada), a Canadian Trotskyist group formed in the 1970s
 International Socialists (Denmark), a Danish Trotskyist group formed in 1984
 International Socialists (Ireland), a defunct Irish Trotskyist group
 International Socialists (Netherlands), a Dutch Trotskyist group formed in 1988
 International Socialists (Norway), a Norwegian Trotskyist group from the 1980s to 2008
 International Socialists (Sweden), a Swedish Trotskyist group formed in 2002
 International Socialists (UK), now known as the Socialist Workers Party, a British Trotskyist group

Other Trotskyist organizations 
 International Socialist Group, a defunct British section of the reunified Fourth International from 1987 to 2009
 International Socialist Movement, a defunct current within the Scottish Socialist Party from 2001 to 2006
 International Socialists (Scotland), a Scottish organization affiliated with the Committee for a Workers' International
 International Socialists (United States), an American organization from the 1960s to 1986

Other organizations 
 International Socialist League (South Africa), a South African communist party from 1915 to 1921
 International Socialist Party, now known as the Communist Party of Argentina, an Argentinian communist party formed in 1918
 International Socialists of Germany, a German left communist party in the 1910s

Other 
 International socialism, the perception of all communist revolutions being part of a single global class struggle

See also 
 
 International Socialist Alternative, an international association of Trotskyist parties
 International Socialist Alternative (Austria), the Austrian section of International Socialist Alternative, formed in 2000
 International Socialist Circle, an Argentinian anarchist organization from 1879 to 1901
 International Socialist Group (disambiguation)
 International Socialist League (disambiguation)
 International Socialist Left, a German Trotskyist organization active until 2016
 International Socialist Movement (South Africa), a South African Trotskyist organization formed in 1989
 International Socialist Network, a British socialist organization from 2013 to 2015
 International Socialist Opposition, a faction of the British International Socialists in the 1970s
 International Socialist Organization (disambiguation)
 International Socialist Party of Subcarpathian Rus', a Czechoslovakian communist party from 1920 to 1921
 List of left-wing internationals